The trapezoid body (the ventral acoustic stria) is part of the auditory pathway where some of the axons coming from the cochlear nucleus (specifically, the anterior cochlear nucleus) decussate (cross over) to the other side before traveling on to the superior olivary nucleus.  This is believed to help with localization of sound.

The trapezoid body is located in the caudal pons, or more specifically the pontine tegmentum.  It is situated between the pontine nuclei and the medial lemniscus.  After nerves from the cochlear nucleus cross over in the trapezoid body and go on to the superior olivary nucleus, they continue to the lateral lemniscus, then the inferior colliculus, then the medial geniculate body, before finally arriving at the primary auditory cortex.

References

Pons
Auditory system